The Mandıra-Kırklareli railway was a  long railway in East Thrace, Turkey. The railway branched off from the Istanbul-Pythio railway near Mandıra and headed north to Kırklareli.

References

Standard gauge railways in Turkey
Railway lines opened in 1912
Railway lines closed in 1987